This article lists the diplomatic missions of the Cook Islands. The Cook Islands is a self governing state in free association with New Zealand, . The Cook Islands has three diplomatic missions abroad (a High Commission in Wellington, a Consulate in Auckland, and a High Commission in Suva, Fiji. It has previously had a High Commission in Canberra and an Embassy in Brussels. The High Commission to New Zealand has multiple accreditations. The Cook Islands also has a number of honorary consulates.

Oceania
 

 Wellington (High Commission)
 Auckland (Consulate-General)
 Suva (High Commission)

Multilateral organizations
 Lancaster (Permanent Mission to the International Maritime Organization)
 Thoiry (Permanent Delegation to UNESCO)
 Avarua (Non-Resident Mission to the European Union)

See also
Foreign relations of the Cook Islands
List of diplomatic missions in the Cook Islands

Notes

References

External links
Cook Islands Foreign Affairs and Immigration: Cook Islands Overseas Offices, updated 2015-08-11

Foreign relations of the Cook Islands
Cook Islands
Diplomatic missions